People's United Financial, Inc. was an American bank holding company that owned People's United Bank. The bank operated 403 branches in Connecticut, southeastern New York State, Massachusetts, Vermont, Maine, and New Hampshire. It was the second-largest full-service bank in New England, one of the largest in the northeast, and the 46th-largest in the United States.

On April 2, 2022, the bank merged with M&T Bank and was fully integrated into M&T by the third quarter of 2022.

History 
The company was founded in 1842 as Bridgeport Savings Bank in Bridgeport, Connecticut. In 1981, the bank became the first in the country to provide a telephone bill paying service. After acquiring People's Bank of Vernon, CT in 1983, the company was renamed People's Bank. It has since acquired several other banks in New England to become the second largest in the region.

In 1985, the company began issuing credit cards, but by 2004, it sold its credit card division to the Royal Bank of Scotland at a premium of $360 million. The company moved to a new headquarters building designed by Richard Meier in 1989.

On June 7, 2007, the bank changed its name to People's United Bank.

In February 2008, a data storage company, Archive America, lost backup tapes in transit containing the "names, birthdays, Social Security numbers and other information" of customers of the bank and of The Bank of New York Mellon. On November 22, 2010, the bank opened its first location in Boston.

People's United was notably selected to manage the core bank accounts for the Commonwealth of Massachusetts in November 2016, and was also selected to manage the core bank accounts for the state of Vermont in August 2017.

On February 22, 2021, M&T Bank, based in Buffalo, New York, announced an agreement to acquire People's United Bank in an all-stock transaction valuing at approximately $7.6 billion.

Acquisition history
From its founding as Bridgeport Savings Bank to the present, People's United has acquired several banks and other financial institutions in New England including:

20th century
1955: acquired Southport Savings Bank 
1981: acquired the assets of First Stamford Bank and Trust Company 
1982: acquired Guardian Federal Savings and Loan Association of Bridgeport
1986: acquired First Federal Savings Bank 
1991: acquired the deposits of Hartford-based Landmark Bank 
1998: acquired Norwich Financial Corporation for $164 million in cash

21st century
 January 1, 2008: acquired Chittenden Corporation for $1.9 billion Also in 2008, the bank acquired Ocean Bank of New Hampshire, Maine Bank & Trust, Merrill Merchants Bank, Flagship Bank, and Bank of Western Massachusetts.
February 2010: acquired Financial Federal Corporation, an equipment financing company 
April 2010: acquired Butler Bank, which was seized by the Federal Deposit Insurance Corporation 
December 2010: acquired LSB Corporation and Smithtown Bancorp 
July 2011: acquired Danvers Bancorp
2012: acquired 57 branches in the greater New York metro area from Royal Bank of Scotland, including 53 branches in Stop & Shop supermarkets 
October 2015: People's United subsidiary acquired Kesten-Brown Insurance
April 2017: acquired Suffolk Bancorp 
July 2017: acquired LEAF Commercial Capital 
June 2018: People's United Bank agreed to purchase Farmington Bank in a deal valued at $544 million

Headquarters 

People's United Financial's headquarters was built in 1989, designed by architect Richard Meier. Rising 18 stories above the northern side of I-95, the People's Bank Building (known officially as Bridgeport Center) is the tallest building in downtown Bridgeport.

References

External links 

Companies formerly listed on the Nasdaq
American companies established in 1842
Banks established in 1842
Banks based in Connecticut
Companies based in Bridgeport, Connecticut
1842 establishments in Connecticut
2022 mergers and acquisitions